Glenea hieroglyphica is a species of beetle in the family Cerambycidae. It was described by Pesarini and Sabbadini in 1997.

References

hieroglyphica
Beetles described in 1997